Kisauni Constituency is an electoral constituency in Kenya. It is one of six constituencies in Mombasa County. The constituency has seven wards electing councillors for the Mombasa municipal council. With the promulgation of the new constitution in August 2010, Nyali Constituency was carved out from Kisauni Constituency.

Members of Parliament

Locations and wards

References

External links 
Map of the constituency

Constituencies in Mombasa County
Constituencies in Coast Province